Films and Casting TEMPLE Pty Ltd is an Australian-based international film production, film consultancy and casting company based in Fox Studios Australia-Sydney. The company was founded in 2000 by film director Anupam Sharma and is committed to making diverse Australian films for a global audience. The company is recognized for pioneering film links between India and Australia and specialises in Bollywood/Indian cinema.

About

Films and Casting TEMPLE first opened its doors on 30 August 2000. Their first feature film project as Australian producers was Dil Chahta Hai, which was released in 2001. Post this as a consultant production company or Australian production company they produced many renowned Bollywood films such as Koi Mil Gaya, Heyy Babyy, Salaam Namaste, Dhoom, along with international films like the Danish film At Worlds End, Chinese film Love in Hong Kong and Just Dance the TV Series.

In 2000 the late Yash Johar hired TEMPLE for consultancy and location work in Australia for Kabhi Khushi Kabhi Gham.

In 2001 and 2002 TEMPLE produced as Australian Production company two of the biggest ads for India which included Bharthi Birth TVC, Scorpio Launch TVC, Hero Honda, Lays chips.

2000 hired by Yash Raj Films to provide specialist crew for Dhoom.

In 2003 TEMPLE was the Australian Production Company for Janansheen.

In 2003 TEMPLE produced and released the first-ever guide to filming in Australia for the Indian film industry. The guide was launched in Mumbai by Australian Tourist Commission.

In 2004, a delegation composed of key players from the Australian entertainment industry including Producer John Winter (‘Rabbit Proof Fence’, ‘Doing Time for Patsy Cline’) who was also heading the delegation, Steve Cooper, M.D of the multi-award-winning Australian post-production company, BEEPS, and Shireen Ardeshir from IDP Education supported by The Australia India Business Council (AIBC) and its film chapter the Australia India Film Arts Media and Entertainment (FAME) Council, along with ausFILM, Australian Film Commission, and various State film bodies initiated by Anupam Sharma owner of Sydney based production company Films and Casting TEMPLE pty ltd was a major player at FRAMES 2004 – the biggest Asian convention on the entertainment business which was held in Mumbai from the 15th to 17 March.

In 2005 Temple was again hired by Dharma for consultancy and location surveys for their film Kabhi Alvida Na Kehna and Yash Raj Films for their film Salaam Namaste.

In 2006 and 2007 TEMPLE was hired as an Australian production company for a series of projects for Australia which included Love Story 2050, Heyy Babyy, Van Heusen Autumn and Spring launch.

2008 Temple was hired by the cult TV Program MTV Roadies to be their Australian Production Company and also produced the promos for Real TV for TACTIC Australia in India.

As part of its initiative to promote film-related professional exchange between India and Australia, Films and Casting TEMPLE's managing director started an Australian film initiative that held its inaugural event, called the Australian Film Festival of India in December 2011. The festival received strong support from film professionals in India as well as Australia, with some well-known people such as Baz Luhrmann, Bill Bennett, John Winter and Hugh Jackman. In 2012, renowned Australian director Bill Bennett announced that his next thriller would be shot in India as a collaborative project. The festival is now in its third year of production and making.

In 2012, Films and Casting TEMPLE was the Australian-based production company for Pramod's Films feature film From Sydney with Love, the debut feature by Prateek Chakravorty. The film features iconic Australian landmarks, and is the first mainstream Bollywood film to name an Australian capital in its title, making it a landmark production for Indian cinema. In 2012, TEMPLE was the Production company and consultant for SBS/ Bollywood Star.

2013 Commissioned by ANMM to produce Indian Aussies being directed by Anupam Sharma. Also in 2013 TEMPLE was Commissioned to direct Jhappi Time campaign the biggest and costliest ad campaign by Destination NSW for India. On 5 December 2013, a group of businessmen of Indian origin established the Australia India Film Fund (AIFF) and signed Films and Casting TEMPLE as the production company to produce their screen content (minimum one feature film and one documentary/television series every 18 months). The fund was established to strengthen the film ties between India and Australia, triggering multimillion-dollar productions and using the Australian 40% producer offset. It is the first private film fund to produce India-centric Australian stories. The fund aims to maintain a local crew of at least 90% Australians and a minimum of 80% local cast. General manager of Films and Casting TEMPLE and filmmaker Anupam Sharma was appointed as the AIFF head of films.

In 2015 the company produced their first feature film UnIndian, directed and written by Anupam Sharma. The film starred the famous Australian cricketer Brett Lee and Bollywood actress Tannishtha Chatterjee.

2016 travelled in India consulting on Spirit of India run and producing The Run.

In 2017, Anupam Sharma produced and directed an award-winning documentary, The Run, which revolved around a politician and ultra-marathon runner Pat Farmer run from Kanyakumari to Kashmir.

In 2018 at a ceremony hosted by NSW Premier Gladys Berejiklan as part of AACTA's Asia International Engagement Program, the NSW Premier announced Anupam Sharma's production companies two new projects Honour and Bollywood Downunder. Distributor Forum Films has signed a first-look deal with the company for Anupam's two confirmed new projects.

Owner

The managing director of Films and Casting TEMPLE is the well-known Indian filmmaker, Anupam Sharma. Anupam opened Films and Casting TEMPLE on 30 August 2000.

Sharma secured a bachelor's and master's degree from the University of New South Wales, Australia, and has written a number of research papers about media and films, along with a thesis—with distinction—on Indian cinema.

Appointed as one of the ambassadors for Australia Day 2013, and nominated as one of the 50 most influential professionals in the Australian film industry by Encore magazine, Anupam is a filmmaker, an author and an international consultant on Indian cinema.

In 2012, he was the chief judge and advisor for the first ethnic reality series in Australia, Bollywood Star, along with professional photographer/talent spotter Raj Suri and professional dancer Dipti Patil.

In 2011, Sharma launched An Australian Film Initiative to assist in the marketing and promotion of Australian screen culture in non-traditional markets. The initiative began with the first annual Australian Film Festival of India. Annually, the festival exhibits Australian cinema to Indian audiences and has screened in Dehradun, Delhi and Mumbai. Each year, industry professionals support the festival; past supporters include Baz Luhrmann, Hugh Jackman and John Winter.

Anupam Sharma made his directorial debut with UnIndian starring Brett Lee and Tannishtha Chatterjee. Sharma has two projects in the making Honour and Bollywood DownUnder, which were both announced in Mumbai last year at a ceremony hosted by NSW Premier Gladys Berejiklian and Australian Academy of Cinema and Television Arts Asia International Engagement Program.

Work 

Production:
 Prem Aggan (1998)
 Kadhalar Dinam (1999)
 Pyaar Koi Khel Nahin (1999)
 Yes & No (short) (2000)
 Beti No. 1 (2000)
 Deewane (2000)
 Hadh Kar Di Aapne (2000)
 Dil Chahta Hai (2001)
 Hollywood (2003)
 Kitne Door... Kitne Paas (2002)
 Aap Mujhe Achche Lagne Lage (2002)
 Janasheen (2003)
 In Conversation (TV short) (2004)
 Heyy Babyy (2007)
 Love Story 2050 (2008)
 Sankham (2009)
 Victory (2009)
 Orange (2010)
 Just dance 2(video game) (2010)
 Crook (2010)
 We Are Family (2010)
 Love in Space (2011)
 From Sydney with Love (2012)
 Being Lara Bingle (2012)
 Indian Aussies: Terms & Conditions Apply (2013)
 UnIndian (2015)
 The Run (2017)

Other Work
2018: Audi ad Virat Kohli

Awards

 The Run won the Best Documentary award at the Newcastle Film Festival

Partnerships

Films and Casting TEMPLE is part of an incentive to promote film relationships between India and Australia. As a result, the company is associated with Global Indian Talent, An Australian Film Initiative and the website Bollywood in Australia, all of which aim to promote the professional relationships between Indian and Australian in the cinematic realm.

External links
 Official Website
 An Australia Film Initiative 
 Global Indian Talent
 The Run Film
 unINDIAN

References

Film production companies of Australia